Krossen is a village in Lindesnes municipality in Agder county, Norway.

Krossen may also refer to:

Krossen (Kristiansand), a neighborhood in the city of Kristiansand, Agder county, Norway
Krossen, Telemark, a village in Vinje municipality, Vestfold og Telemark county, Norway
Krosno Odrzańskie, a city in Krosno county, Poland

See also
Crossen (disambiguation)